Stephan is used as a surname, and may refer to:

 Alexander Stephan (1946–2009), German American Germanist
 Alexander Stephan (footballer) (born 1986), German footballer
 Beat Stephan, Swiss curler
 Bernhard Stephan (born 1943), German director
 Christoph Stephan (born 1986), German biathlete
 Cora Stephan (born 1951), German writer
 Daniel Stephan (born 1973), German handball player
 Dietrich Stephan (born 1969), American geneticist
 Doug Stephan (born 1946), American radio talk show personality
 Édouard Stephan (1837–1923), French astronomer
 Elie Stephan (born 1986), Lebanese basketball player
 Friedrich Stephan (21st century), American scientist
 Friedrich Stephan (soldier) (1892-1945), Wehrmacht Generalleutnant in World War II  
 Guillaume Stephan (born 1982), French footballer
 Guy Stéphan (born 1956), France national football team assistant coach
 Hans-Georg Stephan (born 1950), German university professor
 Kenneth C. Stephan (21st century), Nebraska Supreme Court justice
 Len Stephan (born 1935), Australian politician
 Martin Stephan (1777–1846), German American Lutheran pastor
 Robert Stephan (born 1933), American politician
 Rudi Stephan (1887–1915), German composer
 Ruth Stephan (1925–1975), German actress
 Tobias Stephan (born 1984), Swiss ice hockey player
 Tom Stephan (21st century), American electronic musician
 Trevor Stephan (born 1995), American baseball player
 Wilfried Stephan (born 1955), German canoeist

Breton-language surnames
Surnames of German origin
Surnames from given names